The Korn Ferry Tour Championship presented by United Leasing & Finance is the year-end golf tournament of the Korn Ferry Tour. It has been played at a variety of courses; starting in 2019 it will be played at Victoria National Golf Club in Newburgh, Indiana as part of a 10-year deal. Since the 2008 edition, the purse has been $1,000,000, with the winner receiving $180,000.

The format of the tournament is stroke play at 18 holes for four days, a total of 72 holes. Originally, the field consisted of the top 60 players on the money list, all attempting to be among the 25 to earn PGA Tour cards. Since 2013, it has been part of the Korn Ferry Tour Finals and the field consists of the top 75 players from the Korn Ferry Tour money list and the non-exempt players ranked 126 to 200 on the PGA Tour's money list at the start of the Finals. Beginning in 2013, 50 PGA Tour cards will be awarded after the event.

It is considered the flagship event of the Korn Ferry Tour, with twenty OWGR points to the winner, compared to sixteen for other Finals events and fourteen for regular season tournaments.

Tournament host courses

Winners

Bolded golfers graduated to the PGA Tour via the Korn Ferry Tour regular-season money list, in years that the event was not part of the Korn Ferry Tour Finals. In years that the event has been part of the Finals, all winners and runners-up have earned PGA Tour cards.
Sources:
Note: Green highlight indicates scoring records.

Notes

References

External links
Coverage on Korn Ferry Tour's official site

Korn Ferry Tour events
Golf in Indiana
Golf in Florida
Golf in South Carolina
Golf in Texas
Golf in California
Golf in Alabama
Golf in Georgia (U.S. state)
Golf in Oregon
1993 establishments in Oregon
Recurring sporting events established in 1993